Neustadt (German for new town or new city) may refer to:

Places 
 Neustadt (urban district)

Czech Republic 
Neustadt an der Mettau, Nové Město nad Metují
Neustadt an der Tafelfichte, Nové Město pod Smrkem
Nové Město na Moravě

Germany

Bavaria
 Neustadt an der Aisch, the capital of the district Neustadt an der Aisch-Bad Windsheim
 Neustadt bei Coburg, a town in the district of Coburg
 Neustadt an der Donau, a town in the district of Kelheim
 Neustadt am Kulm, a town in the district of Neustadt (Waldnaab)
 Neustadt am Main, a town in the district of Main-Spessart
 Neustadt an der Waldnaab, the capital of the district of Neustadt (Waldnaab)

Brandenburg
 Neustadt an der Dosse, a town in the district of Ostprignitz-Ruppin
 Amt Neustadt (Dosse), a collective municipality in Neustadt (Dosse)

Lower Saxony
 Neustadt am Rübenberge, a town in the district of Hanover

Rhineland-Palatinate
 Neustadt an der Weinstraße, a city and urban district, the largest city of that name in Germany
 Neustadt (Weinstraße) Hauptbahnhof, a railway station
 Neustadt, Westerwaldkreis, a municipality in the district Westerwaldkreis
 Neustadt (Wied), a municipality in the district of Neuwied

Saxony
 Neustadt in Sachsen, a town in the district of Sächsische Schweiz
 Neustadt (Sachs) railway station
 Neustadt, Vogtland, a municipality in the district Vogtlandkreis

Thuringia
 Neustadt, Eichsfeld, a municipality in the district of Eichsfeld
 Neustadt an der Orla, a town in the district Saale-Orla-Kreis 
 Neustadt am Rennsteig, a municipality in the district of Ilm-Kreis in Thuringia

Other places in Germany
 Neustadt, a municipal district of Bremen
 Neustadt, Hamburg, a quarter within the borough of Hamburg-Mitte
 Neustadt, Hesse, a town in the district of Marburg-Biedenkopf, Hesse
 Neustadt in Holstein, a town in the district of Ostholstein, Schleswig-Holstein
 Neustadt, a part of the urban district of Innenstadt, Cologne, North Rhine-Westphalia
 Neustadt, a town and part of the municipality Titisee-Neustadt, Baden-Württemberg

Hungary 
 Neustadt am Zeltberg, Sátoraljaújhely
 Neustadt an der Donau, Dunaújváros
 Neustadt an der Tisza, Tiszaújváros

Poland 
 Neustadt in Oberschlesien, Prudnik
 Neustadt in Westpreußen, Wejherowo

Other places
 Neustadt, Ontario, Canada
 Neustadt (Strasbourg), a district of Strasbourg, France
  or Cristian, Brașov, Romania
  or Nové Mesto nad Váhom, Slovakia
 Wiener Neustadt, Austria

Other uses
 Neustadt (surname), a surname (including a list of people with the name)
 Neustadt International Prize for Literature, an American literary award
 NSK Neustadt Prize for Children's Literature, an American literary award
 Neustadt, the hometown of the protagonist in Emil and the Detectives

See also
 Neustadt, Dresden (disambiguation)